Alexander McGregor (born 9 May 1896) was a Scottish footballer who played for Celtic, Dumbarton, St Mirren and Clydebank.

References

1896 births
Scottish footballers
Dumbarton F.C. players
Celtic F.C. players
Scottish Football League players
Year of death missing
St Mirren F.C. players
Clydebank F.C. (1914) players
People from Renfrew
Association footballers not categorized by position